Eupithecia halosydne is a moth in the  family Geometridae. It is found on the Juan Fernandez Islands in Chile.

The length of the forewings is about 8–9 mm for females. The forewings are pale ochraceous brown. The hindwings are slightly paler than forewings. Adults have been recorded on wing in March.

References

Moths described in 1922
halosydne
Moths of South America
Endemic fauna of Chile